is a 1987 action role-playing game developed by Nihon Falcom as the fifth installment in the Dragon Slayer line of games. Originally released for the PC-8801 Personal Computer, it has since been released on a wide variety of platforms.

Gameplay
Sorcerian is a side-scrolling action-RPG. The player can create up to ten characters, from whom up to four members can be present in a party at the same time. Each character is highly customizable, with four different classes/races (fighter, wizard, elf, and dwarf) and over 60 possible jobs/occupations (ranging from clown to exorcist) available for them to perform; each has its own strengths and weaknesses, affecting the seven primary attributes (strength, intelligence, protection, magic resistance, vitality, dexterity, and karma) in different ways, as well as different equipment limitations.

The player can choose from fifteen different scenarios, or quests, to play through in the order of their choice. The party must battle enemies and perform tasks within the given levels to clear each scenario, before moving onto another scenario of their choice. The player controls the entire party at the same time, with all four members running in a line, jumping in sequence, and attacking in unison. The party members follow behind in a manner similar to the Options in the arcade shooter Gradius (1985). Sorcerian also employs class-based puzzles, such as using a high-strength character to force open doors.

All the characters have a default starting age of 16. Each time a player begins a new scenario, a year passes by, while additional time passes by in towns as a character goes through training or enchants items. The characters age at different rates depending on their race, with humans reaching old age at 60, dwarves at 100, and elves at 200. Upon reaching old age, for every year that passes, a character can die permanently at a random time. There is also an "Advance Time" to speed up the flow of time. Another new feature of Sorcerian was its episodic format that extended across various expansion packs. Besides the default fifteen scenarios that come with the game, there were a number of additional scenario packs released. The aging system was created with the additional scenario packs in mind.

Release 
It was originally released for the NEC PC-8801 in 1987, and was later ported to other personal computer platforms such as the NEC PC-9801, the NEC PC-88VA, the Sharp X1 Turbo, and the MSX2, for which it was released under the title Dragon Slayer V: Sorcerian. An English version for MS-DOS PCs was published by Sierra Entertainment in 1990, ports for the Atari ST, Commodore Amiga, Apple IIGS and Macintosh platforms were announced, but not released.

In 1997, Falcom released Sorcerian Forever for Microsoft Windows-based PCs. In 2000, Falcom released Sorcerian Original, a remake of Sorcerian for Microsoft Windows-based PCs. In addition, console versions of Sorcerian with somewhat differing content from their PC counterparts were developed: A version for the Mega Drive was developed by Sega, a version for the PC Engine CD was developed by Victor Musical Industries, and a version for the Dreamcast was developed by Victor Interactive Software. The Mega Drive version was re-released on the Wii's Virtual Console on September 16, 2008. An iOS version was released on January 20, 2012 by Aeria Inc. Base game includes 5 free scenarios, maximum party size of 5 characters. Pay versions include 10 extra scenarios, maximum party size of 10 characters.

As part of Sorcerian's 25th anniversary, between December 6 and 20 of 2012, Sorcerian for iOS was released for free, and 3 in-game items (10000 Gold, revival LV3 x2, magic item x3) were free, registering as AeriaGames member gets revival LV3 x3 in-game items. In 2014 the PC-88 version was released along with Romancia for the retro game distribution service EGG.

The mobile (iAppli) version, called Advanced Sorcerian, was re-released on Nintendo Switch through the G-Mode Archives label in February 2021.

Add-ons
A number of add-on expansion packs containing new scenarios were developed for the PC-8801 version of Sorcerian, by both Falcom themselves and by other companies:

Developed by Falcom: Sorcerian Utility Vol. 1, Sorcerian Additional Scenario Vol. 1, Sorcerian Additional Scenario Vol. 2 – Sengoku Sorcerian, Sorcerian Additional Scenario Vol. 3 – Pyramid Sorcerian
Developed by Amorphous: Sorcerian New Scenario Vol. 1 – The Visitor from Outer Space, Selected Sorcerian 1, Selected Sorcerian 2, Selected Sorcerian 3, Selected Sorcerian 4, Selected Sorcerian 5
Developed by Quasar Soft: Gilgamesh Sorcerian

Music
The soundtrack to the original Sorcerian was composed by Yuzo Koshiro, Mieko Ishikawa, Reiko Takebayashi, Hideya Nagata, and Takahito Abe. The Falcom-developed Additional Scenarios were handled solely by Ishikawa. The music for the original Sorcerian was arranged by Kenji Kawai for the PC Engine CD release. Rob Atesalp and Ken Allen converted the original score to be a MT-32 MIDI-compatible arrangement of the soundtrack for Sierra Entertainment's English version of the game.

Soundtrack releases for Sorcerian include:
Music from Sorcerian: The original score to the PC-88 version of the game.
All Sounds of Sorcerian: The original sound again, this time in the form of medleys for each scenario, along with two arranged tracks.
Sorcerian Super Arrange Version: A series of three albums featuring arrangements by Hiroyuki Namba. Volume 1 contains a set of arrangements from the base scenario of Sorcerian. Volume 2 contains arrangements from the base scenario and Additional Scenario Vol. 1, along with the original sound of Additional Scenario Vol. 1. Volume 3 contains arrangements and the original sound from Additional Scenario Vol. 2 and Vol. 3.
Perfect Collection Sorcerian: A set of 3 2-disc albums containing various arrangements of the base Sorcerian soundtrack, similar to the Perfect Collection Ys album series.
Sorcerian Forever I & II: Two albums containing upgraded versions of the Sorcerian base scenario soundtrack, similar to the Music from Ys Renewal releases.

Reception
In 1990, Famicom Tsūshin (now Famitsu) reviewed Sega Mega Drive (Genesis) version of the game, giving it a generally positive score of 27 out of 40.

In the July 1990 edition of Games International (issue 16), Theo Clarke was disappointed in this game, calling the animation "rudimentary", and that there was "little realism in the game". He thought it was far more an arcade game than a role-playing game, and awarded it a below average rating of only 6 out of 10, calling it "a well-preserved museum piece".

In the October 1991 edition of Computer Gaming World, Scorpia noted it has "an interesting feature or two" and liked the game's division into many miniquests, stating that instead "of the usual long adventure, this one sports fifteen separate small quests" which "allows for a certain amount of variety". However, she disliked the magic system, and stated "the action is arcade in style, which is typical for a Japanese game, and some will find this irksome" but noted "this is not just hack-and-slash, as there are puzzles to be solved along the way". Scorpia concluded that Sorcerian was a "good for a change of pace" for those comfortable with "arcade" action.

During production of PlatinumGames title Scalebound, game designer Hideki Kamiya said he was inspired by Sorcerian as well as Hydlide 3. He noted the influence of Sorcerian's fantasy theme, "gigantic monsters", different scenarios, "expansive possibilities", "tons of adventures" and enemies such as a hydra boss and "lots of amazing dragons".

References

External links
Official website for Sorcerian Original
Official website for the iOS version via Internet Archive
 Falcom's catalog pages for: Sorcerian forever, Sorcerian Premium Kit, Shichisei no Mahou no Shito, Sorcerian MIDI Collection via Internet Archive
 

1987 video games
Action role-playing video games
DOS games
Dragon Slayer (series)
IOS games
MSX2 games
NEC PC-8801 games
NEC PC-9801 games
Nihon Falcom games
Role-playing video games
Sega Genesis games
Sharp X1 games
Side-scrolling role-playing video games
Sierra Entertainment games
Single-player video games
TurboGrafx-CD games
Video games developed in Japan
Video games featuring protagonists of selectable gender
Video games scored by Kenji Kawai
Video games scored by Yuzo Koshiro
Video games with expansion packs
Virtual Console games
Windows games